Walter Ruben (26 December 1899 – 7 November 1982) was a German Indologist. His main contribution was on the social history of ancient India and on the history of Indian philosophy and literature.

Walter Ruben's Writings

Books
1928 Die Nyayasutra’s Leipzig.
1936 Studien zur Textgeschichte des Ramayana. Stuttgart
1939 Eisenschmiede und Dämonen…. Leiden
1952 Über die Literatur der vorarischen Stämme Indiens. Berlin
1959 Das Pancatantra und seine Morallehre. Berlin
1967-73 Die Gesellschaftliche Entwicklung im alten Indien, vols. 1–6. Berlin

References

1899 births
1982 deaths
German Indologists
German male non-fiction writers
Members of the German Academy of Sciences at Berlin